Typhonodorum is a monotypic genus of flowering plants in the family Araceae. The single species making up this genus is Typhonodorum lindleyanum. The genus is native  to Madagascar, the Comores, Zanzibar, Réunion and Mauritius. This genus is believed to be closely related to Peltandra even though Peltandra is only found in North America and there don't appear to exist closely related genera in the African mainland. There isn't fossil evidence to link the two genera so it has been proposed that there once was a genus in Africa from which the two genera had originated. The African mainland genus spread to North America and to Madagascar 50 million years ago before it broke off. Then the African genus became extinct and the North American and Madagascan genera remained.

References

Aroideae
Monotypic Araceae genera
Flora of the Comoros
Flora of Madagascar
Flora of Mauritius
Flora of Tanzania
Flora of the Zanzibar Archipelago
Flora of Réunion